María Rivera may refer to:

 María Rivera (swimmer) (born 1967), Mexican swimmer.
 María Rivera (activist) (born 1958), Chilean activist